The 1981 San Diego Padres season was the 13th season in franchise history.

Offseason 
 December 8, 1980: Rollie Fingers, Bob Shirley, Gene Tenace and a player to be named later were traded by the Padres to the St. Louis Cardinals for Terry Kennedy, Steve Swisher, Mike Phillips, John Littlefield, John Urrea, Kim Seaman, and Al Olmsted. The Padres completed the deal by sending Bob Geren to the Cardinals on December 10.
 December 8, 1980: Chuck Baker was traded by the Padres to the Minnesota Twins for Dave Edwards.
 December 8, 1980: Mario Ramírez was selected by the Padres from the New York Mets in the rule 5 draft.
 December 15, 1980: Randy Jones was traded by the Padres to the New York Mets for John Pacella and José Moreno.
 December 15, 1980: Rick Sweet was purchased from the Padres by the Seattle Mariners.
 January 13, 1981: Eric Bullock was drafted by the San Diego Padres in the 1st round (5th pick) of the 1981 amateur draft (Secondary Phase), but did not sign.
 March 27, 1981: Tony Phillips, Kevin Bell and Eric Mustad (minors) was traded by the Padres to the Oakland Athletics for Bob Lacey and Roy Moretti (minors).
 March 27, 1981: Eric Rasmussen was released by the Padres.

Regular season

Opening Day Starters

Season standings

Record vs. opponents

Notable transactions 
 June 8, 1981: 1981 Major League Baseball draft
Kevin McReynolds was drafted by the Padres in the 1st round (6th pick).
Tony Gwynn was drafted by the Padres in the 3rd round. Player signed June 16, 1981.
Greg Booker was drafted by the Padres in the 10th round.
John Kruk was drafted by the San Diego Padres in the 3rd round of the  Secondary Phase.

Roster

Player stats

Batting

Starters by position 
Note: Pos = Position; G = Games played; AB = At bats; H = Hits; Avg. = Batting average; HR = Home runs; RBI = Runs batted in

Other batters 
Note: G = Games played; AB = At bats; H = Hits; Avg. = Batting average; HR = Home runs: RBI = Runs batted in

Pitching

Starting pitchers 
Note: G = Games pitched; IP = Innings pitched; W = Wins; L = Losses; ERA = Earned run average; SO = Strikeouts

Other pitchers 
Note: G = Games pitched; IP = Innings pitched; W = Wins; L = Losses; ERA = Earned run average; SO = Strikeouts

Relief pitchers 
Note: G = Games pitched; IP = Innings pitched; W = Wins; L = Losses; SV = Saves; ERA = Earned run average; SO = Strikeouts

Awards and honors 
 Ozzie Smith, SS, Gold Glove Award
 Ozzie Smith, National League Leader Games Played (110)
 Ozzie Smith, National League Leader At-Bats (450)

1981 Major League Baseball All-Star Game

Farm system

References

External links 
 1981 San Diego Padres at Baseball Reference
 1981 San Diego Padres at Baseball Almanac

San Diego Padres seasons
1981 Major League Baseball season
San Diego Padres